Kudamuck is a village situated in Pathanamthitta district, Kerala India.

Geography
Kudamuck is a beautiful place that has many fields, small hills, ponds, old age temple, church, etc. which contribute to the village's beauty. The famous Malayalam writer Payyaneth's family is currently residing here.

Demographics
Around 5000 people live here. There are many castes, religions, depart here.

References

Villages in Pathanamthitta district